Bonnie Kathleen Curtis (born March 26, 1966) is an American film producer whose credits include Saving Private Ryan, A.I., Minority Report, and The Lost World: Jurassic Park, directed by Steven Spielberg. Her first solo project was the 2005 release The Chumscrubber. She then joined Mockingbird Pictures with partner Julie Lynn in 2011. Curtis and Lynn produced Albert Nobbs, which was nominated for three Academy Awards. Curtis is a co-recipient of the 1999 Producers Guild Award for Motion Picture Producer of the Year, for Saving Private Ryan. On March 12, 2015, Curtis was inducted into the Texas Film Hall of Fame. Spielberg congratulated her via video message during the ceremony.

Life and career
Curtis was born in Dallas, Texas. She is a 1988 graduate of Abilene Christian University, where she majored in journalism after graduating from Dallas Christian High School; she is a member of the university's Sigma Theta Chi women's social club. She received the school's Gutenberg Award "for distinguished professional achievement" in journalism.

Her earliest production work was on the films Arachnophobia and Dead Poets Society. In 1989 Curtis started working with Spielberg, starting as a production assistant in what has turned out to be a 17-year professional relationship.

In her career, she has worked with a variety of actors, including Morgan Freeman, Anthony Hopkins, Matthew McConaughey, Jude Law, Tom Hanks, Matt Damon, Vin Diesel, Tom Cruise, and Colin Farrell.

Her project The Chumscrubber was the subject of an interview granted to The Advocate, in which she discussed the connections she saw between her parents' response to her "coming out" as a lesbian and the disbelieving response of the parents in the film to their children's stories of events and actions in their own lives that seem at odds with their parents' perceptions of them. The interview also discussed her fundraising work with the Gay, Lesbian, and Straight Education Network and her appreciation of Spielberg's support, both personally and politically, in the form of such actions as resigning from the national advisory board of the Boy Scouts of America to decry the group's positions on homosexuality.

In 2011, Curtis joined Julie Lynn's Mockingbird Pictures and the two became partners. They have since produced Albert Nobbs, The Face of Love, 5 to 7, and Last Days in the Desert.

In addition to film producing, Curtis is also a well known event speaker. She has spoken at various company retreats, as well as Chicago Ideas Week 2014.

Filmography
She was a producer in all films unless otherwise noted.

Film

Miscellaneous crew

As an actress

Thanks

Television

Thanks

References

External links

Women in Film-Dallas: Top Hollywood producer Bonnie Curtis to be honored at Topaz, September 7, 2004.

1966 births
Abilene Christian University alumni
Film producers from Texas
American women film producers
American lesbians
LGBT people from Texas
LGBT film producers
Living people
People from Abilene, Texas
21st-century American LGBT people